Commodore Robert Cameron Hastie (born 24 May 1933), KStJ CBE RD JP RNR was the Lord-Lieutenant for West Glamorgan from April 1995 to May 2008.

References

1933 births
Living people
Commanders of the Order of the British Empire